Baluchi-ye Bala (also Romanized as Balūchī-ye Bālā; also known as Balūchī-ye Bālā’ī) is a village in Polan Rural District, Polan District, Chabahar County, Sistan and Baluchestan Province, Iran. At the 2006 census, its population was 610, in 107 families.

References 

Populated places in Chabahar County